Jaisalmer House is the former residence of the Maharawal of Jaisalmer in New Delhi. It is part of Lutyens Bungalow Zone (LBZ).

Use 
It is owned by the Government of India. It is used as the administrative headquarters of the Department of Justice, under the Ministry of Law and Justice. The UPSC office is right behind it and the Department of Defence is adjacent to it.

Surroundings 
Important buildings nearby Jaisalmer House include Rashtrapati Bhawan, Vice president's estate, India Gate, All India Congress Committee Headquarters and several embassies. The nearest airport is the Safdarjung airport. Jawaharlal Nehru stadium, a golf course, National War memorial, Parliament of India and the Khan market metro station, are nearby.

Site 
The house has a garden and a parking area.

References 

Royal residences in Delhi